Trichiolaus is a genus of butterflies in the family Lycaenidae.It is now a subgenus of Iolaus.

Lycaenidae
Lycaenidae genera
Taxa named by Per Olof Christopher Aurivillius